The 2023 Southeast Asian Games, commonly known as the 32nd Southeast Asian Games, or the 32nd SEA Games, and commonly known as Cambodia 2023, will be the 32nd edition of the Southeast Asian Games, a biennial sports multi-sport event which will be held from 5 to 17 May 2023 in Phnom Penh, Cambodia.

The announcement was made at the SEA Games Federation Council meeting at Singapore, in conjunction with the 2015 Southeast Asian Games, by the President of the National Olympic Committee of Cambodia, Thong Khon. The Philippines was originally scheduled to host the Games, but was pushed forward to 2019 after Brunei withdrew to host the event. This will be the first time that Cambodia will host the games, as the 3rd Southeast Asian Peninsular (SEAP) Games in 1963 was cancelled due to the political situation in the country at the time. The event will feature 40 sports.

Development and preparation
Following the host selection announcement, Prime Minister Hun Sen approved the final design of the Games’ main stadium. During a state visit by Hun Sen to Beijing in May 2014, China's leader Xi Jinping (also Communist party general secretary) promised to fund the construction of the main stadium of the new multi-purpose sports complex on the Satellite City of Phnom Penh in Khan Chroy Jong Va. The 60,000-seat main stadium, which is estimated to cost about $157 million and will be built by a Chinese construction firm, will be completed between 2019 and 2020 with a Chinese grant covering the entire project. A multipurpose arena, the Morodok Techo National Sports Complex will house an Olympic swimming pool, an outdoor football pitch, a running track, tennis courts and dormitories for athletes.

Budget 
According to Vongsey Visoth, secretary of state for the Ministry of Economy and Finance, building and setting up the facilities and fields required for the various competitions will cost between $30 to $40 million.

Speaking at the public forum Macroeconomic Management and the 2023 Budget Law held in Phnom Penh on Jan. 25, Visoth explained that setting up and hosting events at stadiums and other locations might end up costing more than $200 million. In preparation for the event, Cambodia has built a number of infrastructures, as well as sports venues and sports facilities.

Volunteer 
The National Volunteer Committee of CAMSOC has announced the recruitment of nearly 7,000 volunteers to assist at the SEA Games and ASEAN Para Games.

Participating nations

Participating nations
All 11 members of Southeast Asian Games Federation (SEAGF) are expected to take part in the 2023 SEA Games. Below is a list of all the participating NOCs.
Southeast Asian Games Federation

 
  (Host)
 
 
 
  (677)
 
  (905)

Medal table

Key

Marketing

Branding
The official logo and slogan for the 2023 Southeast Asian Games were decided on 2 July 2020 by the 2023 Cambodian SEA Games Organizing Committee and was officially unveiled on 7 August. A design competition for the games' logo was held in 2019 with the final design reportedly consists of the Angkor Wat and four dragons as its main motifs. The initial slogan for the games unveiled was "Sport Into Peace"  The logo was later slightly revised so it could also be used for the 2023 ASEAN Para Games. The slogan in English was revised to Sport: Live in Peace"

A mascot design competition was also organized in 2019 which was open to Cambodian citizens who are at least 15 years of age. The contest required applicants to submit designs that followed a rabbit theme and reflected Khmer culture. The deadline for the competition was on 30 November 2019. The winning design consists of two rabbits wearing traditional Cambodian attire; a female in red named Rumduol and a male in blue named Borey. Red and blue are colors from the Cambodian flag.

The Games
The opening ceremony for the games will be held on 5 May 2023, however the cricket and football tournaments will commence earlier on 26 April 2023.

Sports

Concerns and controversies

WT-led boycott and exclusion of ITF-rule taekwondo competition

IFMA-led boycott of Kun Khmer competition
In July 2022, the Cambodian SEA Games Organizing Committee (CAMSOC) decided to link Muay Thai to Kun Khmer and used the name "Kun Khmer (Muay)" as the official name for the competition. This action resulted from the displeasure of the Cambodian public, who criticized the organizing committee for not displaying sufficient patriotism in its promotion of Cambodia's traditional martial arts.

Afterwards, International Federation of Muaythai Associations (IFMA), the international federation of Muay Thai, has claimed that the organizing committee was seeking to work with an organization that is not recognized by the International Olympic Committee (IOC) and the Olympic Council of Asia (OCA) as the sanctioning body for the competition. The IFMA was planning to bring this matter to the attention of the IOC, the IOC Ethics Commission, the OCA, and the World Anti-Doping Agency (WADA).

In January 2023, the IFMA sent warnings to each national federation to stop sending their teams to compete in the Kun Khmer competition, otherwise the violating national federations will be banned from upcoming World Games, Asian Indoor and Martial Arts Games, IFMA World Muaythai Championships, and other IFMA-sanctioned events.

Participation and medal cap
Participating nations are limited in the number of athletes they can enter in certain sports – martial arts, dragon boat and esports, while such restriction is not applied to the host country. The Philippines, which claims to be backed by other participating nations aside from the host, has protested such regulation alleging it to be a strategy for Cambodia to finish at least fourth in the medal tally.

The Philippines protested Cambodia's plan to only allow a maximum of two gold medals to be awarded to a competitor in the gymnastics events. This was later revised to three following a complaint from the Gymnastics Association of the Philippines.

References

Further reading
 Cambodia lists 39 sports in 2023 SEA Games (2022, April 11). Philippine News Agency. Retrieved June 20, 2022.

Southeast Asian Games by year
Southeast Asian Games 2023
Southeast Asian Games